The Tangimoana Station is a radio communications interception facility run by the New Zealand Government Communications Security Bureau. It is located 30 kilometres west of Palmerston North.

Function 

The Station was opened in 1982, replacing an earlier facility at Irirangi, near Waiouru.  According to the Federation of American Scientists (FAS), the facility is part of ECHELON, the worldwide network of signals interception facilities, run by the UKUSA (UK-USA Security Agreement) consortium of intelligence agencies (which shares global electronic and signals intelligence among the Intelligence agencies of the US, UK, Canada, Australia and NZ). Its role in this capacity was first identified publicly by peace researcher Owen Wilkes in 1984, and investigated in detail by peace activist and independent journalist Nicky Hager. The equipment at the Tangimoana facility "is equally capable of receiving signals transmitted by radio and satellite which do not include foreign intelligence and which are domestic concerning and involving NZ citizens."

See also 
Waihopai Station 
New Zealand intelligence agencies
New Zealand Security Intelligence Service
Anti-Bases Campaign

References

Further reading
 Hager, Nicky (1996). Secret Power: New Zealand's Role in the International Spy Network. Nelson, NZ: Craig Potton Publishing. .

External links
 Government Communications Security Bureau
 Anti Bases Campaign
 Government Communications Security Bureau Act 2003

Buildings and structures in Manawatū-Whanganui
Government buildings in New Zealand
UKUSA listening stations
1982 establishments in New Zealand